Evangelos "Vangelis" Karampoulas (alternate spellings: Vaggelis, Karaboulas) (Greek: Ευάγγελος "Βαγγέλης" Καράμπουλας; born November 18, 1981) is a Greek professional basketball player. He is a 2.00 m (6 ft 6 in) tall shooting guard–small forward. His nickname is Mr. Promotion, due to the fact that the clubs he plays with almost always get promoted to the next higher league level.

Professional career
During his professional career, Karampoulas has played with some of the following clubs in Greece: Sporting, Makedonikos, MENT, Panellinios (EuroCup), Iraklis, Ikaros Kallitheas, AENK, AEK Athens, Kavala, and Faros Keratsiniou.

He was voted the Greek 2nd Division's MVP in 2010, 2013, and 2017. His teams managed to earn a league promotion from the Greek 2nd Division to the top-tier level Greek 1st Division in five consecutive seasons, achieving this eight times overall (2010, 2013, 2014, 2015, 2016, 2017, 2019, 2020), while also winning the Greek 2nd Division championship a total of five times (2010, 2013, 2014, 2015, 2019).

In 2017, he joined the Greek 3rd Division club Ionikos Nikaias. During the Greek 2nd Division 2018–19 season, while playing with Ionikos, he scored 61 points in a game against Ethnikos Piraeus. During the game, he made 10 three-point field goals.

References

External links
EuroCup Profile
Eurobasket.com Profile
Greek League Profile 
Draftexpress.com Profile
AEK.com Profile
Sport24.gr Article On Vangelis Karampoulas 

1981 births
Living people
AEK B.C. players
Aigaleo B.C. players
Diagoras Dryopideon B.C. players
Faros Keratsiniou B.C. players
Greek men's basketball players
Ikaros B.C. players
Ionikos Nikaias B.C. players
Iraklis Thessaloniki B.C. players
Makedonikos B.C. players
MENT B.C. players
Nea Kifissia B.C. players
Panellinios B.C. players
Shooting guards
Small forwards
Sporting basketball players